The discography of the American alternative rock group Wilco, consists of twelve studio albums, five extended plays (EPs), three live albums, twelve singles and four videos. As of 2012 they had sold in excess of two million albums worldwide.

Following the breakup of Uncle Tupelo, the band's first three studio albums were released on Reprise Records. During recording for the band's fourth album, Yankee Hotel Foxtrot, Reprise dropped the band from the label, causing outcry from media outlets such as the Chicago Tribune. The band signed with fellow Warner Bros. Records subsidiary Nonesuch Records in 2002, where the band has released all of its material since. Wilco recorded two albums of Woody Guthrie songs with Billy Bragg, and performed as a session band for The Minus 5 on their Down with Wilco album. Yankee Hotel Foxtrot was the most successful album for the band, earning a Gold certification by the Recording Industry Association of America (RIAA).

Albums

Studio albums

Live albums

Collaborations

EPs

Singles

Compilations

Miscellaneous
These songs have not appeared on an official album by Wilco, but several have appeared on their Alpha Mike Foxtrot: Rare Tracks 1994 - 2014 rarities collection. The song "The T.B. Is Whipping Me" with Syd Straw was the first-ever release by Wilco.

Videography

See also
 Jeff Tweedy discography
 Uncle Tupelo discography

Notes

References

External links
 Official website
 
 

Discographies of American artists
Discography
Rock music group discographies
Alternative rock discographies